Oidaematophorus is a genus of moths in the family Pterophoridae with a cosmopolitan distribution.

Ecology
Host plants mainly belong to the Asteraceae.

Species

Oidaematophorus balsamorrhizae 
Oidaematophorus baroni 
Oidaematophorus borbonicus 
Oidaematophorus brucei 
Oidaematophorus castor 
Oidaematophorus catalinae 
Oidaematophorus cineraceus 
Oidaematophorus constanti 
Oidaematophorus cretidactylus 
Oidaematophorus downesi 
Oidaematophorus eupatorii 
Oidaematophorus giganteus 
Oidaematophorus grandis 
Oidaematophorus grisescens 
Oidaematophorus guttatus 
Oidaematophorus iwatensis 
Oidaematophorus kellicottii 
Oidaematophorus lindseyi 
Oidaematophorus lithodactyla 
Oidaematophorus madecasseus 
Oidaematophorus mathewianus 
Oidaematophorus mauritius 
Oidaematophorus mineti 
Oidaematophorus negus 
Oidaematophorus nigrofuscus 
Oidaematophorus occidentalis 
Oidaematophorus parshuramus 
Oidaematophorus phaceliae 
Oidaematophorus pseudotrachyphloeus 
Oidaematophorus rileyi 
Oidaematophorus rogenhoferi 
Oidaematophorus trachyphloeus 
Oidaematophorus vafradactylus

Former species 

 Oidaematophorus beneficus

References

Oidaematophorini
Moth genera
Taxa named by Hans Daniel Johan Wallengren